Betty Lou Shipley (July 31, 1931 – March 14, 1998) was the twelfth poet laureate of the state of Oklahoma. Shipley's term as laureate was cut short by her death. Along with authoring three books of poetry, Shipley was the poetry editor for Byline Magazine and operator of Full Count Press and, later, Broncho Press.

Early life
Betty Lou Shipley (née Forsythe) was born in Edmond, Oklahoma on July 11, 1931. She lived in Enid, Oklahoma and Duncan, Oklahoma as a child. She graduated from Duncan High School in 1949 and went on to earn a degree in secondary education and a master's in creative studies from the University of Central Oklahoma.

Awards
Her book Someone Say Amen was awarded the 1998 Oklahoma Book Award.

Works
 Called Up Yonder: Poems from the Bible Belt (Cardinal, 1980)
 Somebody Say Amen (By-Line, 1997)
 Meltdown: Poems from the Core (Full Count, 1980)

See also

 Poets Laureate of Oklahoma

References

1931 births
1998 deaths
20th-century American people
20th-century American women
20th-century poets
American women poets
People from Duncan, Oklahoma
People from Edmond, Oklahoma
Poets Laureate of Oklahoma
University of Central Oklahoma alumni
Writers from Enid, Oklahoma